Torsten Lilliecrona (4 January 1921 – 15 October 1999) was a Swedish actor. He is mostly famous for his role as Melker Melkersson in the highly successful TV show Vi på Saltkråkan (Life on Seacrow Island) for which Astrid Lindgren wrote the script. He starred in over 100 productions in film and television before his death in 1999 as well as in radio shows and theater productions, but eventually became identified with the character Melker Melkerson.

Selected filmography

Rid i natt! (1942) - Anders Månsson (uncredited)
The Heavenly Play (1942) - Peasant (uncredited)
Katrina (1943) - Man talking with Gustaf at the dance (uncredited)
Kungsgatan (1943) - Villgott (uncredited)
Natt i hamn (1943) - Pajen (uncredited)
Kungajakt (1944) - Footman
Den osynliga muren (1944) - Soldier (uncredited)
Flickan och djävulen (1944) - Executioner (uncredited)
 The Emperor of Portugallia (1944) - Boy in the grocery store (uncredited)
Jolanta the Elusive Pig (1945) - Folke Lindgren
Krigsmans erinran (1947) - Mayer (cook) (uncredited)
Jørund Smed (1948)
Port of Call (1948) - Fighter with Mustache (uncredited)
 Private Bom (1948) - Inskrivningsofficeren (uncredited)
Smeder på luffen (1949) - Strömmer, smith (uncredited)
 The Street (1949) - Undercover Police Officer (uncredited)
Prison (1949) - Film Photographer (uncredited)
 Love Wins Out (1949) - Prison guard in Ravensbrück (uncredited)
 Andersson's Kalle (1950) - Helling's Companion (uncredited)
 The Quartet That Split Up (1950) - Rescuer (uncredited)
Living on 'Hope' (1951) - Office clerk (uncredited)
Customs Officer Bom (1951) - French prison guard (uncredited)
Summer Interlude (1951) - Ljus-Pelle (uncredited)
Secrets of Women (1952) - Waiter at the nightclub (uncredited)
Han glömde henne aldrig (1952) - Policeman (uncredited)
 Love (1952) - Johan Johansson
69:an, sergeanten och jag (1952) - Edvin Rosenhjelm
Summer with Monika (1953) - Chaufför på grönsakslagret
Barabbas (1953) - Supervisor at Copper Mine on Cyprus (uncredited)
I dur och skur (1953) - Sid's director
All the World's Delights (1953) - Mickel
 Speed Fever (1953) - Lundkvist, lector
 Stupid Bom (1953) - Beppo
Aldrig med min kofot eller... Drömtjuven (1954) - Bergman
Taxi 13 (1954) - Police Lieutenant Johansson (uncredited)
Flicka utan namn (1954) - Bo Ferne
Seger i mörker (1954) - Policeman (uncredited)
A Lesson in Love (1954) - Hotel Avsvik's Receptionist (uncredited)
Karin Månsdotter (1954) - Jon Månsson - Guard at Gripsholm Castle (uncredited)
 The Yellow Squadron (1954) - Doctor
Två sköna juveler (1954) - Bill
Herr Arnes penningar (1954) - Jailer
A Night at Glimmingehus (1954) - Jesper Stenswärd
Mord, lilla vän (1955) - Rune Gordon
 Darling of Mine (1955) - Man at Skansen Reading a Newspaper (uncredited)
Blockerat spår (1955) - Torsten Lilliecrona
Den glade skomakaren (1955) - Kalle Ljung
Flicka i kasern (1955) - Corporal
Laughing in the Sunshine (1956) - Policeman
 A Doll's House (1956) - Physician
Egen ingång (1956) - Policeman (uncredited)
Rätten att älska (1956) - Teacher
Girls Without Rooms (1956) - Guest at Restaurant
Johan på Snippen (1956) - Speaker
Den långa julmiddagen (1956) - Brandon, cousin
 Mother Takes a Vacation (1957) - Director Broms
Räkna med bråk (1957) - Stranded Admiral
Lille Fridolf blir morfar (1957) - Patrik
 Night Light (1957) - Policeman
Far till sol och vår (1957) - Trent
 The Koster Waltz (1958) - Reklambyrådirektör (uncredited)
 The Jazz Boy (1958) - Partygäst
Swinging at the Castle (1959) - Driver (uncredited)
 Crime in Paradise (1959) - Torsten Lindgren
 Heart's Desire (1960)- Hans Mortimer
 On a Bench in a Park (1960) - Theater Director
Do You Believe in Angels? (1961) - Stenman, staff manager
Two Living, One Dead (1961) - The Doctor
Svenska Floyd (1961) - Journalist
Åsa-Nisse bland grevar och baroner (1961) - Patrik Segerclou
Vi fixar allt (1961) - Oskarsson
Briggen Tre Liljor (1961) - Skollärare Esberg
Adam och Eva (1963) - Foreman at the Dream Factory
Älskling på vift (1964) - The Chief
Tjorven, Båtsman och Moses (1964) - Melker Melkersson
Tjorven och Skrållan (1965) - Melker Melkersson
Tjorven och Mysak (1966) - Melker
Sarons ros och gubbarna i Knohult (1968) - Patrik Segerclou
Pappa varför är du arg? Du gjorde likadant själv när du var ung (1968) - Gustaf Vikingson
Vi på Saltkråkan (1968) - Melker Melkersson
Ni ljuger (1969) - Prison inspector (uncredited)
En och en (1978) - Gustav
Höjdhoppar'n (1981) - Doctor

References

External links

NYTimes filmography
Torsten Lilliecrona at the Swedish Film Institute (Swedish)

1921 births
1999 deaths
People from Jönköping
Swedish male film actors
Swedish male television actors
20th-century Swedish male actors